Malcolm Finlay (1919 – 3 November 2007) was a British basketball player. He competed in the men's tournament at the 1948 Summer Olympics. Findlay also served as a commissioned officer in the Royal Canadian Naval Volunteer Reserve during the Second World War.

References

External links
 

1919 births
2007 deaths
British men's basketball players
Olympic basketball players of Great Britain
Basketball players at the 1948 Summer Olympics
Sportspeople from South Shields
English expatriates in Canada
Royal Canadian Navy personnel of World War II
Royal Canadian Navy officers
Military personnel from County Durham